Ratnagiri may refer to:

 Ratnagiri, a municipality in Maharashtra, India
 Ratnagiri taluka, a sub-division in which the municipality is located
 Ratnagiri district, in which the municipality and the taluka is located
 Ratnagiri Airport, located at Mirjole in the Ratnagiri district
 Ratnagiri Lok Sabha constituency, a former national parliamentary constituency
 Ratnagiri Assembly constituency, a state assembly constituency
 Ratnagiri Fort, Maharashtra, a coastal fort also known as Ratnadurg
 Ratnagiri railway station, which serves the city
 Ratnagiri railway division of Indian Railways
 Ratnagiri Fort, Andhra Pradesh, located in Sri Sathya Sai district in India
 Ratnagiri, Odisha, an ancient Buddhist site in India
 Ratnagiri Murugan Temple, in Vellore district of Tamil Nadu, India